China operates a number of supercomputer centers which, altogether, hold 29.3% performance share of the world's fastest 500 supercomputers. China's Sunway TaihuLight ranks third in the TOP500 list.

In the November 2019 list, China dominated the globe's highest performance machines list with 228 out of the top 500 fastest supercomputers in the world, exceeding the second placing (United States) which had 117.

History

The origins of these centers go back to 1980s, when the State Planning Commission, the State Science and Technology Commission and the World Bank jointly launched a project to develop networking and supercomputer facilities in China. In addition to network facilities, the project included three supercomputer centers. The progress of supercomputing in China has been rapid; the country's most powerful supercomputer placed 43rd in November 2002 (DeepComp 1800), 11th by November 2003 (DeepComp 6800), 10th by June 2004 (Dawning 4000A), and by November 2010 (Tianhe-1A) held top spot. China would go on to fall behind Japan in June 2011 until June 2013 when the country's most powerful supercomputer once again clocked in as the world record.

Prior to the Sunway TaihuLight, Chinese supercomputers have used "off the shelf" processors, e.g. Tianhe-I uses thousands of Intel and Nvidia chips, and uses the Linux operating system which is open-source software. However, to avoid possible future technology embargo restrictions, the Chinese are developing their own processors such as the Loongson, a MIPS type processor.

According to the MIT Technology Review, the Loongson processor would power the Dawning supercomputers by 2012, producing a line of totally Chinese-made supercomputers that reach petaflop speeds.

In April 2021, seven Chinese supercomputing entities were added to the Entity List of the United States Department of Commerce's Bureau of Industry and Security.

Supercomputing centers

SCCAS 
The Supercomputing Center of the China Academy of Sciences (SCCAS) is a support service unit affiliated to the Computer Network Information Center (CNIC) of the Chinese Academy of Sciences with the origin going back to 1980s. The Supercomputing Center of the China Academy of Sciences (SCCAS) provides academic support functions to the National Centers. SCCAS, which is located in Beijing, is the Northern main node and operation center for China National Grid (CNGrid).

Yinhe-1 was independently designed and manufactured as the first leading China's supercomputer in 1983 with a performance level of 100 MFLOPS.

Shanghai
Shanghai Supercomputer Center (SSC) was established in December 2000. It was the first high-performance computing public service platform in China and the fastest supercomputer in China at that time. The Shanghai Supercomputer Center operates the Magic Cube-II supercomputer that runs at 400 teraflops.

Tianjin 
The National Supercomputing Center in Tianjin is one of the main centers and is the first state-level supercomputing center approved in May 2009. It houses the Tianhe-I supercomputer which in October 2010 became the top speed record holder in the world by consistently operating at 2.507 petaflops. The Tianjin Computer Institute had been active as far back as 1984 when it developed the 16-bit TQ-0671 microcomputer system. A commercial affiliate of the Tianjin center had previously made the PHPC100 personal supercomputer in 2008 which was about twice the size of a normal desktop computer, but had 40 times the speed. In 2010 a second generation model was released.

Shenzhen
The National Supercomputing Center in Shenzhen is the second national supercomputing center after the one based in Tianjin and houses the second fastest machine in China, and the third fastest in the world. In May 2010 the Nebulae computer in Shenzhen placed second on the Top 500 supercomputer list, after the Cray computer at the Oak Ridge National Laboratory in Tennessee.

Changsha
Foundations for a new major branch of the National Supercomputing Center (国家超级计算中心 Guójiā Chāojíjìsuàn Zhōngxīn) were laid in Hunan University, Changsha on 28 November 2010 as the first National Supercomputing Center in Central China and the third National Supercomputing Center in China apart from the two centers which are located in Tianjin and Shenzhen. The National Supercomputing Changsha Center is managed and operated by Hunan University. It operates the Tianhe-1A Hunan Solution – NUDT YH MPP supercomputer which runs at 1342 teraflops. It was the most powerful supercomputer in the world at that time from its operation in November 2010 to November 2011.

Jinan
The National Supercomputing Center in Jinan operates the Sunway BlueLight MPP supercomputer that runs at 795 teraflops.

Guangzhou
The National Supercomputer Center in Guangzhou operates the fourth most powerful supercomputer in the world (as of June 2018) Tianhe-2 (MilkyWay-2), which runs at 33,000 teraflops. It also operates the Tianhe-1A Guangzhou Solution – NUDT YH MPP supercomputer that runs at 211 teraflops.

Wuxi
The National Supercomputing Center in Wuxi houses the Sunway TaihuLight supercomputer, the 4th most powerful supercomputer in the world as of November 2020. It is in the Binhu District, along the shores of Lake Tai, hence the name.

Zhengzhou 
In December 2020, the National Supercomputing Zhengzhou Center was passed the inspection for operation, becoming the seventh national supercomputing center in China.

Kunshan 
In 2020, the National Supercomputing Kunshan Center successfully passed the acceptance of experts, becoming the second supercomputing center in Jiangsu Province and the eighth supercomputing center in China.

Chengdu
In September 2020, the Chengdu Supercomputing Center was officially completed and put into operation.

See also

 History of supercomputing
 Supercomputer architecture
 Supercomputing in Europe
 Supercomputing in India
 Supercomputing in Japan
 Supercomputing in Pakistan

References

 
Supercomputing
Supercomputer sites